Numerous notable people have lived in or come from Guam.

Entertainment
Sabrina Iren Krasniqi
Jason Barnes
Nathaniel Berg 
Q. Allan Brocka
Ann Curry
Dan Ho
Pia Mia
Donovan Patton
DPR Live

Games and athletics
Morgan Hikaru Aiken
Frank Camacho
Jeff Cobb
Jason Cunliffe
Joe Duarte
Christopher Duenas
Victoria Muniz
Daniel O'Keeffe
Sean Reid-Foley
Ray Robson
Benjamin Schulte
Pilar Shimizu
William Stinnett
Jon Tuck
Derek Mandell
De'Aundre Cruz

Business
Eloise Baza

Diplomacy
Yuri Kim

Lawyers
Leevin Camacho
Benjamin Cruz
Alicia Limtiaco
Douglas Moylan
Don Parkinson

Military
Peter Gumataotao
Curtis W. Howard
Susan Pangelinan

Politics

Activists 

 Siobhon McManus

Delegates
 Vicente T. Blaz
 Madeleine Bordallo
 Michael San Nicolas
 Robert A. Underwood
 Antonio Borja Won Pat

Governors

Civilian 
T.J. Griffie

Appointed 
Marcellus Boss (acting)
William Corbett (acting)
Bill Daniel
Ford Quint Elvidge
Joseph Flores
Manuel Flores Leon Guerrero
Richard Barrett Lowe
Carlton Skinner

Elected 
Joseph Franklin Ada
Ricardo Bordallo
Eddie Calvo
Paul McDonald Calvo
Carlos Camacho
Lou Leon Guerrero (current)
Felix Perez Camacho
Carl T.C. Gutierrez

Senators

Current
Regine Biscoe Lee
Telena Cruz Nelson
Kelly Marsh Taitano
Tina Rose Muña Barnes
Amanda Shelton
Pedo Terlaje
Therese M. Terlaje

Former
Tom Ada
Frank Aguon
John P. Aguon
Elizabeth P. Arriola
Madeleine Bordallo
Ricardo Bordallo
Benjamin Cruz
Herminia D. Dierking
Ping Duenas
James Espaldon
Alfred Flores
Judith Guthertz
Carl Gutierrez
Marcia K. Hartsock
Lou Leon Guerrero
Manuel Flores Leon Guerrero
Manuel U. Lujan
Tommy Morrison
Ted S. Nelson
Tony Palomo
Ben Pangelinan
Don Parkinson
John F. Quan
Franklin Quitugua
Ignacio P. Quitugua
Edward Diego Reyes
Joe T. San Agustin
Michael San Nicolas
Angel Santos
Francis E. Santos
Francisco R. Santos
Dave Shimizu
Nerissa Bretania Underwood
Antonio Borja Won Pat
Judith Won Pat

Mayors
Ken Joe Ada
John A. Cruz
Felix Ungacta

International organizations
Bob Beck
Lourdes Pangelinan

References

People

Guam
Guam